Mezhukkupuratti is a style of preparation for vegetarian dishes in Kerala (especially in Central Travancore) where the vegetable is stir-fried with spices. Chopped onions or shallots may also be used.

Usually the dish is prepared from any of the following vegetables:
 Raw Plantain (Ml വാഴക്ക). Dish is called as Vazhakka mezhukkupuratti.   
 Elephant foot yam (Mlചേന). Dish is called as Chena mezhukkupuratti.
 Bitter Gourd (Ml പാവൽ). Dish is called as Pavakka mezhukkupuratti.
 Ivy Gourd (Ml കോവക്ക). Dish is called as Kovakka mezhukkupuratti.
 Yardlong Bean (Ml പയർ). Dish is called as Payar mezhukkupuratti.
 Green bean. Dish is called as Beans mezhukkupuratti.

Other vegetables may also be substituted for preparing mezhukkupuratti. Resultant dish name will be vegetable name appended with word "mezhukkupurattti".

References